By the False Door (Spanish: Por la puerta falsa) is a 1950 Mexican film directed by Fernando de Fuentes.

Cast
 Pedro Armendáriz
 Luis Beristáin
 Roberto Cañedo
 Enrique Díaz 'Indiano'
 Enedina Díaz de León
 Antonio R. Frausto
 Ramón Gay
 Rita Macedo
 José Muñoz
 Andrea Palma
 Joaquín Roche
 Humberto Rodríguez
 Aurora Ruiz
 Pepe del Río
 Eduardo Vivas

External links
 

1950 films
1950s Spanish-language films
Films directed by Fernando de Fuentes
Mexican drama films
1950 drama films
Mexican black-and-white films
1950s Mexican films